Alstonia angustiloba is a tree in the dogbane family Apocynaceae.

Description
The bark is greyish or brownish. Its fragrant flowers feature a white, yellow or cream corolla.

Distribution and habitat
Alstonia angustiloba is native to Thailand, Peninsular Malaysia, Singapore, Sumatra and Java. It is found in a variety of habitats from sea level to  altitude.

References

angustiloba
Plants described in 1857
Trees of Thailand
Trees of Malesia
Taxa named by Friedrich Anton Wilhelm Miquel